Farmclub.com is an American TV show, which aired on USA Network. It was broadcast from January 31, 2000 to June 15, 2001. The show's content featured "it" musical artists of the moment and promoted unsigned bands through national exposure and website interaction, with such featured moments as the return of N.W.A., in which Snoop Dogg substituted for the late Eazy-E.

Farmclub.com signed artists to real record deals and put their albums out through partnerships with Interscope, Def Jam, Universal, and other labels. The unsigned artists were selected from viewer votes from their website of the same name. Hosted by model/actress and former Miss USA 1996 Ali Landry and former MTV VJ Matt Pinfield, the show's label signed artists such as: British DJ Sonique, and rock bands Dynamite Hack and Sev. The exposure also helped other bands obtain mass audience appeal leading to subsequent record deals such as Dog Fashion Disco and heavy metal band Chimaira.

Farmclub.com had a short lived partnership with Extreme Championship Wrestling in late 2000.

Artists who performed on Farmclub 
20 Dead Flower Children 
98 Degrees
Alley Life
The American Tragedy
...And You Will Know Us by the Trail of Dead 
At the Drive-In 
Audra & The Antidote 
Bad Religion
Beanie Sigel
Beck
Bloodhound Gang
Bone Thugs-n-Harmony  
Busta Rhymes 
Cash Money Millionaires 
Cold 
Chimaira 
Creed
Cypress Hill 
D12 
Disturbed  
DMX 
Dog Fashion Disco 
Dream 
Dragon Fire 
Dr. Dre 
Eastcide 
Eminem 
Eve 
Excon
Gargantua Soul
Godsmack 
Green Day
Headstrong
Incubus 
Invisibl Skratch Piklz 
Insolence 
IPS 
Jay-Z
Ja Rule 
Jinxed 
Kid Rock 
Kittie
Korn
Lil' Kim 
Limp Bizkit 
Linkin Park
LL Cool J
MDFMK 
Method Man
Methods of Mayhem 
[minus] later known as [Minus.Driver] after signing with Universal.
Monster Zero 
Moisture
Mýa 
Mystikal 
MxPx 
Nelly 
The New System (Nik Sharp & Eric Bice of Suburban Tragedy) 
Nickelback 
No Doubt 
N.W.A. 
Orgy 
P.O.D.   
Papa Roach 
Powerman 5000 
Powderburn
Primus 
Queens of the Stone Age
Rapnexx 
RK aka the Fugitive 
Sev 
Sevendust 
Sloppy Meateaters 
Smash Mouth 
Sum 41
Skycopter9 
Sonique
Staind 
Static-X
Steaknife
Stereomud
Stone Temple Pilots
Stroke 9
Sundaze 
System of a Down 
Spine 
Third Eye Blind 
Three Six Mafia
Trucker 
U2
U.P.O. 
Wu Tang Clan
The Warbers

Artists signed by Farmclub 
 Alley Life - 1999
 Sonique - October 1999
 Deep Obsession - February 2000
 Sev - June 2000
 Bionic Jive
 Fisher
 Dynamite Hack
 Moisture

Music from the show 
After the demise of the show from television, Farmclub.com continued to exist online and through the release of an album entitled Live and Unreleased from Farmclub.com.

Track listing 
 N.W.A. – "Nuthin' But a "G" Thang"
 Eminem – "The Real Slim Shady"
 Limp Bizkit with Method Man – "N 2 Gether Now"
 DMX – "Party Up"
 Nelly – "Country Grammar (Hot...)"
 Staind – "Mudshovel"
 Mystikal – "Shake Ya Ass"
 Ja Rule – "Between Me and You"
 Powerman 5000 – "Nobody's Real"
 Eve – "Love Is Blind"
 Nickelback – "Leader of Men"
 Mýa – "Case of the Ex"
 D12 – "Shit on You"
 SEV – "Same Old Song"
 ...And You Will Know Us by the Trail of Dead –  "Richter Scale Madness"
 Bionic Jive – "Pump"
 Alley Life – "That's the Way We Roll"

External links 
 

1990s American music television series
2000s American music television series
1998 American television series debuts
2000 American television series endings
USA Network original programming